Óscar Armando Díaz (15 October 1970 – 12 December 1998), nicknamed Tito, was a Salvadoran professional footballer, prior to which had played football in High School.

Club career
Nicknamed Tito, Díaz played for FAS, forming the forward line with Marlon Medrano, and Municipal Limeño.

International career
Díaz made his debut for El Salvador in an April 1997 friendly match against Guatemala which proved to be his only international game. He was a non-playing squad member at the 1996 CONCACAF Gold Cup.

Personal life and death
Díaz was the son of Delfina Díaz de Escobar and José Carmen Escobar. Díaz was shot dead in a bar in Santa Rosa de Lima on 12 December 1998. In his honour, Municipal Limeño decided to withdraw the no. 10 jersey. The murder has never been solved.

Díaz's son, Cristian Bustillo, played for FESA and joined C.D. Águila in September 2011.

See also
List of unsolved murders

References

External links
 El fútbol catracho de luto - El Diario de Hoy 

1970 births
1990s murders in El Salvador
1996 CONCACAF Gold Cup players
1998 crimes in El Salvador
1998 deaths
1998 murders in North America
Association football forwards
C.D. FAS footballers
Deaths by firearm in El Salvador
El Salvador international footballers
Male murder victims
People murdered in El Salvador
Salvadoran footballers
Salvadoran murder victims
Unsolved murders in El Salvador